The 2009–10 Phoenix Suns season was the 42nd season of the franchise in the National Basketball Association (NBA). Head coach Alvin Gentry—who coached the Suns the final 31 games of the previous season—was looking to reinstill in the Suns their offensive tendencies of seasons past: using the strengths of Steve Nash and Amar'e Stoudemire. A season-and-a-half experiment with Shaquille O'Neal ended in the summer before the season. With this subtraction and the retention of Jason Richardson, the Suns were primed for a return to the playoffs after a one-season absence. Phoenix would be the only team in the league to post a three-point field goal percentage of 40% or more while leading the NBA in scoring at 110 points per contest. They would return to the playoffs, defeating the Portland Trail Blazers in six games in the First Round and sweeping the rivaled San Antonio Spurs in four games in the Semifinals. Returning to the Western Conference Finals for the first time in four seasons, the Suns met the top-seeded Los Angeles Lakers, but lost the series in six games to the defending and eventual NBA champions. The Suns had the best team offensive rating in the NBA.

Following the season, Stoudemire signed as a free agent with the New York Knicks, and General Manager Steve Kerr left to return as a commentator for TNT.

This would be the last time the Suns reached the playoffs until their 2020–21 season, ending the second-longest active NBA post-season appearance drought at that time.

Key dates 
 June 25 – The 2009 NBA draft took place in New York City.
 July 8 – The free agency period started.

Offseason

NBA Draft

Roster

Roster notes 
 Small forward Taylor Griffin only played 8 games and didn't play for the majority of the season and the playoffs.

Pre-season

Regular season

Standings

Record vs. opponents

Game log 

|- bgcolor="#bbffbb"
| 1
| October 28
| @ Clippers
| 
| Steve Nash (24)
| Grant Hill (13)
| Steve Nash (8)
| Staples Center15,974
| 1–0
|- bgcolor="#bbffbb"
| 2
| October 30
| Golden State
| 
| Leandro Barbosa (24)
| Channing Frye, Louis Amundson (8)
| Steve Nash (20)
| US Airways Center18,422
| 2–0

|- bgcolor="#bbffbb"
| 3
| November 1
| Minnesota
| 
| Channing Frye (25)
| Grant Hill (10)
| Steve Nash (14)
| US Airways Center15,376
| 3–0
|- bgcolor="#bbffbb"
| 4
| November 3
| @ Miami
| 
| Steve Nash (30)
| Grant Hill (12)
| Steve Nash (8)
| American Airlines Arena15,105
| 4–0
|- bgcolor="#ffcccc"
| 5
| November 4
| @ Orlando
| 
| Amar'e Stoudemire (25)
| Amar'e Stoudemire (14)
| Goran Dragić (6)
| Amway Arena17,461
| 4–1
|- bgcolor="#bbffbb"
| 6
| November 6
| @ Boston
| 
| Jason Richardson (34)
| Jason Richardson (10)
| Steve Nash (12)
| TD Garden18,624
| 5–1
|- bgcolor="#bbffbb"
| 7
| November 8
| @ Washington
| 
| Jason Richardson (22)
| Grant Hill (13)
| Steve Nash (17)
| Verizon Center14,143
| 6–1
|- bgcolor="#bbffbb"
| 8
| November 9
| @ Philadelphia
| 
| Jason Richardson (29)
| Grant Hill, Jason Richardson (8)
| Steve Nash (20)
| Wachovia Center10,205
| 7–1
|- bgcolor="#bbffbb"
| 9
| November 11
| New Orleans
| 
| Amar'e Stoudemire (21)
| Goran Dragić (7)
| Steve Nash (10)
| US Airways Center16,517
| 8–1
|- bgcolor="#ffcccc"
| 10
| November 12
| @ Lakers
| 
| Jared Dudley (14)
| Louis Amundson (9)
| Steve Nash (5)
| Staples Center18,997
| 8–2
|- bgcolor="#bbffbb"
| 11
| November 15
| Toronto
| 
| Amar'e Stoudemire (30)
| Jason Richardson (10)
| Steve Nash (9)
| US Airways Center16,605
| 9–2
|- bgcolor="#bbffbb"
| 12
| November 17
| @ Houston
| 
| Amar'e Stoudemire (23)
| Grant Hill (7)
| Steve Nash (16)
| Toyota Center16,396
| 10–2
|- bgcolor="#ffcccc"
| 13
| November 19
| @ New Orleans
| 
| Amar'e Stoudemire (23)
| Channing Frye (10)
| Steve Nash (10)
| New Orleans Arena14,520
| 10–3
|- bgcolor="#bbffbb"
| 14
| November 22
| Detroit
| 
| Amar'e Stoudemire (21)
| Grant Hill (8)
| Steve Nash (9)
| US Airways Center18,422
| 11–3
|- bgcolor="#bbffbb"
| 15
| November 25
| Memphis
| 
| Amar'e Stoudemire (23)
| Jason Richardson (5)
| Steve Nash (16)
| US Airways Center18,284
| 12–3
|- bgcolor="#bbffbb"
| 16
| November 27
| @ Minnesota
| 
| Jason Richardson (22)
| Louis Amundson (8)
| Steve Nash (11)
| Target Center18,225
| 13–3
|- bgcolor="#bbffbb"
| 17
| November 29
| @ Toronto
| 
| Jason Richardson (22)
| Grant Hill (9)
| Steve Nash (16)
| Air Canada Centre17,721
| 14–3

|- bgcolor="#ffcccc"
| 18
| December 1
| @ New York
| 
| Steve Nash (20)
| Jared Dudley (7)
| Steve Nash (8)
| Madison Square Garden19,763
| 14–4
|- bgcolor="#ffcccc"
| 19
| December 2
| @ Cleveland
| 
| Channing Frye (22)
| Amar'e Stoudemire (12)
| Goran Dragic, Steve Nash (5)
| Quicken Loans Arena20,562
| 14–5
|- bgcolor="#bbffbb"
| 20
| December 5
| Sacramento
| 
| Steve Nash (32)
| Amar'e Stoudemire (21)
| Steve Nash (6)
| US Airways Center17,747
| 15–5
|- bgcolor="#ffcccc"
| 21
| December 6
| @ Lakers
| 
| Amar'e Stoudemire (18)
| Amar'e Stoudemire (9)
| Steve Nash (10)
| STAPLES Center18.997
| 15–6
|- bgcolor="#ffcccc"
| 22
| December 8
| @ Dallas
| 
| Steve Nash (27)
| Channing Frye (9)
| Steve Nash (8)
| American Airlines Center19.857
| 15–7
|- bgcolor="#bbffbb"
| 23
| December 11
| Orlando
| 
| Amar'e Stoudemire (28)
| Amar'e Stoudemire (10)
| Steve Nash (18)
| US Airways Center18,216
| 16–7
|- bgcolor="#ffcccc"
| 24
| December 12
| @ Denver
| 
| Steve Nash (28)
| Louis Amundson (11)
| Steve Nash (7)
| Pepsi Center19,155
| 16–8
|- bgcolor="#bbffbb"
| 25
| December 15
| San Antonio
| 
| Amar'e Stoudemire (28)
| Amar'e Stoudemire (14)
| Steve Nash (13)
| US Airways Center17,964
| 17–8
|- bgcolor="#ffcccc"
| 26
| December 17
| @ Portland
| 
| Amar'e Stoudemire (27)
| Amar'e Stoudemire (11)
| Steve Nash (13)
| Rose Garden20,559
| 17–9
|- bgcolor="#bbffbb"
| 27
| December 19
| Washington
| 
| Amar'e Stoudemire (23)
| Amar'e Stoudemire (14)
| Steve Nash (15)
| US Airways Center16,811
| 18–9
|- bgcolor="#ffcccc"
| 28
| December 21
| Cleveland
| 
| Steve Nash (18)
| Amar'e Stoudemire (12)
| Steve Nash (10)
| US Airways Center18,221
| 18–10
|- bgcolor="#ffcccc"
| 29
| December 23
| Oklahoma City
| 
| Amar'e Stoudemire (35)
| Amar'e Stoudemire (14)
| Steve Nash (12)
| US Airways Center15,953
| 18–11
|- bgcolor="#bbffbb"
| 30
| December 25
| Clippers
| 
| Amar'e Stoudemire (26)
| Louis Amundson (10)
| Steve Nash (8)
| US Airways Center16,709
| 19–11
|- bgcolor="#ffcccc"
| 31
| December 26
| @ Golden State
| 
| Steve Nash (36)
| Grant Hill, Amar'e Stoudemire (7)
| Steve Nash (9)
| Oracle Arena19,550
| 19–12
|- bgcolor="#bbffbb"
| 32
| December 28
| Lakers
| 
| Amar'e Stoudemire (26)
| Channing Frye (11)
| Steve Nash (13)
| US Airways Center18,422
| 20–12
|- bgcolor="#bbffbb"
| 33
| December 30
| Boston
| 
| Channing Frye, Amar'e Stoudemire (26)
| Channing Frye (10)
| Steve Nash (8)
| US Airways Center18,422
| 21–12

|- bgcolor="#ffcccc"
| 34
| January 2
| Memphis
| 
| Amar'e Stoudemire (29)
| Louis Amundson (7)
| Steve Nash (13)
| US Airways Center17,135
| 21–13
|- bgcolor="#bbffbb"
| 35
| January 5
| @ Sacramento
| 
| Steve Nash (30)
| Jason Richardson (9)
| Steve Nash (12)
| ARCO Arena13,630
| 22–13
|- bgcolor="#bbffbb"
| 36
| January 6
| Houston
| 
| Steve Nash (26)
| Amar'e Stoudemire (11)
| Steve Nash (12)
| US Airways Center15,811
| 23–13
|- bgcolor="#ffcccc"
| 37
| January 8
| Miami
| 
| Amar'e Stoudemire, Grant Hill (18)
| Amar'e Stoudemire (18)
| Steve Nash (12)
| US Airways Center18,422
| 23–14
|- bgcolor="#bbffbb"
| 38
| January 11
| Milwaukee
| 
| Steve Nash (30)
| Amar'e Stoudemire (10)
| Steve Nash (11)
| US Airways Center 15,116
| 24–14
|- bgcolor="#ffcccc"
| 39
| January 13
| @ Indiana
| 
| Amar'e Stoudemire (21)
| Jason Richardson, Channing Frye (8)
| Steve Nash (9)
| Conseco Fieldhouse10,858
| 24–15
|- bgcolor="#ffcccc"
| 40
| January 15
| @ Atlanta
| 
| Amar'e Stoudemire (28)
| Amar'e Stoudemire (14)
| Steve Nash (11)
| Philips Arena17,605
| 24–16
|- bgcolor="#ffcccc"
| 41
| January 16
| @ Charlotte
| 
| Amar'e Stoudemire (19)
| Amar'e Stoudemire, Louis Amundson (7)
| Steve Nash (5)
| Time Warner Cable Arena17,574
| 24–17
|- bgcolor="#ffcccc"
| 42
| January 18
| @ Memphis
| 
| Steve Nash (22)
| Amar'e Stoudemire (9)
| Steve Nash (12)
| FedExForum18,119
| 24–18
|- bgcolor="#bbffbb"
| 43
| January 20
| New Jersey
| 
| Amar'e Stoudemire (27)
| Amar'e Stoudemire, Robin Lopez, Jason Richardson (7)
| Steve Nash (15)
| US Airways Center15,963
| 25–18
|- bgcolor="#ffcccc"
| 44
| January 22
| Chicago
| 
| Amar'e Stoudemire (23)
| Channing Frye, Jason Richardson, Louis Amundson (8)
| Steve Nash (7)
| US Airways Center18,422
| 25–19
|- bgcolor="#bbffbb"
| 45
| January 23
| Golden State
| 
| Steve Nash (23)
| Robin Lopez, Louis Amundson (9)
| Steve Nash (6)
| US Airways Center17,792
| 26–19
|- bgcolor="#ffcccc"
| 46
| January 25
| @ Utah
| 
| Goran Dragić (32)
| Jason Richardson (6)
| Steve Nash (15)
| EnergySolutions Arena19,911
| 26–20
|- bgcolor="#ffcccc"
| 47
| January 26
| Charlotte
| 
| Steve Nash (23)
| Jared Dudley (10)
| Steve Nash (9)
| US Airways Center15,722
| 26–21
|- bgcolor="#bbffbb"
| 48
| January 28
| Dallas
| 
| Amar'e Stoudemire (22)
| Jared Dudley, Robin Lopez, Channing Frye (6)
| Steve Nash (11)
| US Airways Center17,855
| 27–21
|- bgcolor="#bbffbb"
| 49
| January 31
| @ Houston
| 
| Amar'e Stoudemire (36)
| Amar'e Stoudemire (11)
| Steve Nash (16)
| Toyota Center17,165
| 28–21

|- bgcolor="#bbffbb"
| 50
| February 1
| @ New Orleans
| 
| Amar'e Stoudemire (25)
| Amar'e Stoudemire (12)
| Steve Nash (12)
| New Orleans Arena13,874
| 29–21
|- bgcolor="#bbffbb"
| 51
| February 3
| @ Denver
| 
| Amar'e Stoudemire, Jason Richardson (20)
| Amar'e Stoudemire (17)
| Steve Nash (10)
| Pepsi Center19,155
| 30–21
|- bgcolor="#bbffbb"
| 52
| February 5
| @ Sacramento
| 
| Amar'e Stoudemire (30)
| Amar'e Stoudemire (9)
| Steve Nash (10)
| ARCO Arena14,922
| 31–21
|- bgcolor="#ffcccc"
| 53
| February 10
| Portland
| 
| Amar'e Stoudemire (24)
| Amar'e Stoudemire (9)
| Steve Nash (11)
| US Airways Center18,190
| 31–22
|- bgcolor="#bbffbb"
| 54
| February 16
| @ Memphis
| 
| Jason Richardson (27)
| Amar'e Stoudemire, Robin Lopez (10)
| Steve Nash (16)
| FedExForum11,508
| 32–22
|- bgcolor="#ffcccc"
| 55
| February 17
| @ Dallas
| 
| Amar'e Stoudemire (30)
| Amar'e Stoudemire (14)
| Steve Nash (12)
| American Airlines Center19,974
| 32–23
|- bgcolor="#bbffbb"
| 56
| February 19
| Atlanta
| 
| Amar'e Stoudemire (22)
| Robin Lopez (9)
| Steve Nash (6)
| US Airways Center18,266
| 33–23
|- bgcolor="#bbffbb"
| 57
| February 21
| Sacramento
| 
| Jason Richardson (26)
| Amar'e Stoudemire (14)
| Steve Nash (11)
| US Airways Center17,369
| 34–23
|- bgcolor="#bbffbb"
| 58
| February 23
| @ Oklahoma City
| 
| Amar'e Stoudemire (30)
| Jason Richardson (13)
| Goran Dragic (10)
| Ford Center18,203
| 35–23
|- bgcolor="#bbffbb"
| 59
| February 24
| Philadelphia
| 
| Jason Richardson (24)
| Robin Lopez (10)
| Steve Nash (13)
| US Airways Center17,765
| 36–23
|- bgcolor="#bbffbb"
| 60
| February 26
| Clippers
| 
| Robin Lopez (30)
| Robin Lopez (12)
| Steve Nash (11)
| US Airways Center18,043
| 37–23
|- bgcolor="#ffcccc"
| 61
| February 28
| @ San Antonio
| 
| Amar'e Stoudemire (41)
| Amar'e Stoudemire (12)
| Steve Nash (11)
| AT&T Center18,581
| 37–24

|- bgcolor="#bbffbb"
| 62
| March 1
| Denver
| 
| Amar'e Stoudemire, Grant Hill (19)
| Amar'e Stoudemire (10)
| Steve Nash (10)
| US Airways Center18,159
| 38–24
|- bgcolor="#bbffbb"
| 63
| March 3
| @ Clippers
| 
| Amar'e Stoudemire (30)
| Amar'e Stoudemire (14)
| Steve Nash (15)
| STAPLES Center17,455
| 39–24
|- bgcolor="#ffcccc"
| 64
| March 4
| Utah
| 
| Amar'e Stoudemire (30)
| Amar'e Stoudemire, Robin Lopez, Grant Hill, Jason Richardson (7)
| Steve Nash (15)
| US Airways Center17,912
| 39–25
|- bgcolor="#bbffbb"
| 65
| March 6
| Indiana
| 
| Amar'e Stoudemire (30)
| Jared Dudley (12)
| Steve Nash, Grant Hill (5)
| US Airways Center18,180
| 40–25
|- bgcolor="#ffcccc"
| 66
| March 12
| Lakers
| 
| Amar'e Stoudemire (29)
| Amar'e Stoudemire (16)
| Steve Nash (8)
| US Airways Center18,422
| 40–26
|- bgcolor="#bbffbb"
| 67
| March 14
| New Orleans
| 
| Amar'e Stoudemire (36)
| Amar'e Stoudemire (12)
| Steve Nash (12)
| US Airways Center18,218
| 41–26
|- bgcolor="#bbffbb"
| 68
| March 16
| Minnesota
| 
| Jason Richardson (27)
| Robin Lopez (9)
| Steve Nash (14)
| US Airways Center18,179
| 42–26
|- bgcolor="#bbffbb"
| 69
| March 19
| Utah
| 
| Amar'e Stoudemire (44)
| Robin Lopez (10)
| Steve Nash (10)
| US Airways Center18,422
| 43–26
|- bgcolor="#bbffbb"
| 70
| March 21
| Portland
| 
| Amar'e Stoudemire (18)
| Amar'e Stoudemire (14)
| Steve Nash (8)
| US Airways Center18,422
| 44–26
|- bgcolor="#bbffbb"
| 71
| March 22
| @ Golden State
| 
| Amar'e Stoudemire (37)
| Grant Hill (9)
| Steve Nash (12)
| Oracle Arena18,722
| 45–26
|- bgcolor="#bbffbb"
| 72
| March 26
| New York
| 
| Amar'e Stoudemire, Leandro Barbosa (18)
| Channing Frye (11)
| Goran Dragic (10)
| U.S. Airways Center18,422
| 46–26
|- bgcolor="#bbffbb"
| 73
| March 28
| @ Minnesota
| 
| Amar'e Stoudemire (30)
| Amar'e Stoudemire (17)
| Steve Nash (11)
| Target Center16,668
| 47–26
|- bgcolor="#bbffbb"
| 74
| March 30
| @ Chicago
| 
| Jason Richardson (27)
| Amar'e Stoudemire (11)
| Steve Nash (10)
| United Center21,169
| 48–26
|- bgcolor="#bbffbb"
| 75
| March 31
| @ New Jersey
| 
| Steve Nash (24)
| Steve Nash (7)
| Steve Nash (14)
| Izod Center14,734
| 49–26

|- bgcolor="#bbffbb"
| 76
| April 2
| @ Detroit
| 
| Amar'e Stoudemire (29)
| Amar'e Stoudemire, Grant Hill, Louis Amundson (6)
| Grant Hill (8)
| Palace of Auburn Hills22,076
| 50–26
|- bgcolor="#ffcccc"
| 77
| April 3
| @ Milwaukee
| 
| Amar'e Stoudemire (22)
| Amar'e Stoudemire (8)
| Goran Dragic (6)
| Bradley Center18,717
| 50–27
|- bgcolor="#bbffbb"
| 78
| April 7
| San Antonio
| 
| Amar'e Stoudemire (29)
| Amar'e Stoudemire, Grant Hill (8)
| Steve Nash (12)
| US Airways Center18,422
| 51–27
|- bgcolor="#ffcccc"
| 79
| April 9
| @ Oklahoma City
| 
| Amar'e Stoudemire (24)
| Amar'e Stoudemire (15)
| Steve Nash (12)
| Ford Center18,334
| 51–28
|- bgcolor="#bbffbb"
| 80
| April 11
| Houston
| 
| Amar'e Stoudemire (35)
| Amar'e Stoudemire (13)
| Steve Nash (11)
| US Airways Center18,422
| 52–28
|- bgcolor="#bbffbb"
| 81
| April 13
| Denver
| 
| Amar'e Stoudemire (26)
| Amar'e Stoudemire, Channing Frye (8)
| Steve Nash (10)
| US Airways Center18,422
| 53–28
|- bgcolor="#bbffbb"
| 82
| April 14
| @ Utah
| 
| Amar'e Stoudemire (20)
| Amar'e Stoudemire (7)
| Steve Nash (11)
| EnergySolutions Arena19,911
| 54–28

Playoffs 
The Suns defeated the Portland Trail Blazers in six games in the first round. They swept the San Antonio Spurs in four games in the Western Conference Semifinals, defeating them for the second time in 10 years, after having been eliminated by them in recent seasons four times in five playoff series. The Suns would face the Pacific division-winners Los Angeles Lakers, also the West's top seed, in the Western Conference Finals, but lose the series in six games.

Game log 

|- bgcolor="#ffcccc"
| 1
| April 18
| Portland
| 
| Steve Nash (25)
| Jason Richardson (10)
| Steve Nash (9)
| US Airways Center18,422
| 0–1
|- bgcolor="#bbffbb"
| 2
| April 20
| Portland
| 
| Jason Richardson (29)
| Grant Hill (8)
| Steve Nash (16)
| US Airways Center18,422
| 1–1
|- bgcolor="#bbffbb"
| 3
| April 22
| @ Portland
| 
| Jason Richardson (42)
| Jason Richardson (8)
| Steve Nash (10)
| Rose Garden20,271
| 2–1
|- bgcolor="#ffcccc"
| 4
| April 24
| @ Portland
| 
| Amar'e Stoudemire (26)
| Grant Hill (12)
| Steve Nash (8)
| Rose Garden20,151
| 2–2
|- bgcolor="#bbffbb"
| 5
| April 26
| Portland
| 
| Channing Frye (20)
| Channing Frye, Jason Richardson (8)
| Steve Nash (10)
| US Airways Center18,422
| 3–2
|- bgcolor="#bbffbb"
| 6
| April 29
| @ Portland
| 
| Jason Richardson (28)
| Grant Hill (12)
| Steve Nash (6)
| Rose Garden20,313
| 4–2

|- bgcolor="#bbffbb"
| 1
| May 3
| San Antonio
| 
| Steve Nash (33)
| Amar'e Stoudemire (13)
| Steve Nash (10)
| US Airways Center18,422
| 1–0
|- bgcolor="#bbffbb"
| 2
| May 5
| San Antonio
| 
| Amar'e Stoudemire (23)
| Amar'e Stoudemire (11)
| Steve Nash (6)
| US Airways Center18,422
| 2–0
|- bgcolor="#bbffbb"
| 3
| May 7
| @ San Antonio
| 
| Goran Dragić (26)
| Steve Nash, Amar'e Stoudemire (8)
| Steve Nash (6)
| AT&T Center18,581
| 3–0
|- bgcolor="#bbffbb"
| 4
| May 9
| @ San Antonio
| 
| Amar'e Stoudemire (29)
| Jason Richardson (8)
| Steve Nash (9)
| AT&T Center18,581
| 4–0

|- bgcolor="#ffcccc"
| 1
| May 17
| @ L.A. Lakers
| 
| Amar'e Stoudemire (23)
| Louis Amundson, Robin Lopez, Jason Richardson (6)
| Steve Nash (13)
| Staples Center18,997
| 0–1
|- bgcolor="#ffcccc"
| 2
| May 19
| @ L.A. Lakers
| 
| Jason Richardson (27)
| Robin Lopez, Amar'e Stoudemire (6)
| Steve Nash (15)
| Staples Center18,997
| 0–2
|- bgcolor="#bbffbb"
| 3
| May 23
| L.A. Lakers
| 
| Amar'e Stoudemire (42)
| Amar'e Stoudemire (11)
| Steve Nash (15)
| US Airways Center18,422
| 1–2
|- bgcolor="#bbffbb"
| 4
| May 25
| L.A. Lakers
| 
| Amar'e Stoudemire (21)
| Amar'e Stoudemire (8)
| Goran Dragić, Steve Nash (8)
| US Airways Center18,422
| 2–2
|- bgcolor="#ffcccc"
| 5
| May 27
| @ L.A. Lakers
| 
| Steve Nash (29)
| Channing Frye (11)
| Steve Nash (10)
| Staples Center18,997
| 2–3
|- bgcolor="#ffcccc"
| 6
| May 29
| L.A. Lakers
| 
| Amar'e Stoudemire (27)
| Channing Frye (13)
| Steve Nash (9)
| US Airways Center18,422
| 2–4

Player statistics

Season 

|- align="center" bgcolor=""
|  || 79 || 0 || 14.8 || .551 || .000 || .545 || 4.4 || 0.4 || .3 || .9 || 4.7
|- align="center" bgcolor="#f0f0f0"
|  || 44 || 5 || 17.9 || .425 || .324 || .877 || 1.6 || 1.5 || .5 || .3 || 9.5
|- align="center" bgcolor=""
|  || 51 || 0 || 7.5 || .371 || .400 || .722 || 1.2 || 0.4 || .1 || .3 || 2.7
|- align="center" bgcolor="#f0f0f0"
|  || 34 || 10 || 7.7 || .387 || . || .400 || 1.8 || 0.2 || .1 || .1 || 1.0
|- align="center" bgcolor=""
|  || style="background:#FF8800;color:#423189;" | 82 || 1 || 24.3 || .459 || style="background:#FF8800;color:#423189;" | .458 || .754 || 3.4 || 1.4 || style="background:#FF8800;color:#423189;" | 1.0 || .2 || 8.2
|- align="center" bgcolor="#f0f0f0"
|  || 80 || 2 || 18.0 || .452 || .394 || .736 || 2.1 || 3.0 || .6 || .1 || 7.9
|- align="center" bgcolor=""
|  || 81 || 41 || 27.0 || .451 || .439 || .810 || 5.3 || 1.4 || .8 || .9 || 11.2
|- align="center" bgcolor="#f0f0f0"
|  || 8 || 0 || 4.0 || .400 || .000 || .500 || 0.3 || 0.1 || .0 || .3 || 1.3
|- align="center" bgcolor=""
|  || 81 || 81 || 30.0 || .478 || .438 || .817 || 5.5 || 2.4 || .7 || .4 || 11.3
|- align="center" bgcolor="#f0f0f0"
|  || 2 || 0 || 3.5 || . || . || . || 1.0 || 0.0 || .0 || .0 || 0.0
|- align="center" bgcolor=""
|  || 51 || 31 || 19.3 || .588† || . || .704 || 4.9 || 0.1 || .2 || 1.0+ || 8.4
|- align="center" bgcolor="#f0f0f0"
|  || 81 || 81 || 32.8 || .507 || .426 || style="background:#FF8800;color:#423189;" | .938 || 3.3 || style="background:#FF8800;color:#423189;" | 11.0 || .5 || .1 || 16.5
|- align="center" bgcolor=""
|  || 79 || 76 || 31.5 || .474 || .393 || .739 || 5.1 || 1.8 || .8 || .4 || 15.7
|- align="center" bgcolor="#f0f0f0"
|  || style="background:#FF8800;color:#423189;" | 82 || style="background:#FF8800;color:#423189;" | 82 || style="background:#FF8800;color:#423189;" | 34.6 || style="background:#FF8800;color:#423189;" | .557† || .167 || .771 || style="background:#FF8800;color:#423189;" | 8.9 || 1.0 || 0.6 || style="background:#FF8800;color:#423189;" | 1.0+ || style="background:#FF8800;color:#423189;" | 23.1
|- align="center" bgcolor=""
| * || 11 || 0 || 6.5 || .433 || .143 || .762 || 0.6 || 0.3 || .0 || .0 || 3.9
|}

* – Stats with the Suns.
† – Minimum 300 field goals made.
+ – Minimum 70 games played or 100 blocks.

Playoffs 

|- align="center" bgcolor=""
|  || style="background:#FF8800;color:#423189;" | 16 || 0 || 12.1 || .528† || . || .429 || 3.5 || 0.1 || .4 || .4 || 2.9
|- align="center" bgcolor="#f0f0f0"
|  || style="background:#FF8800;color:#423189;" | 16 || 0 || 15.6 || .417 || .343 || .708 || 1.3 || 1.3 || .3 || .1 || 7.2
|- align="center" bgcolor=""
|  || 3 || 0 || 4.3 || .333 || . || 1.000^ || 0.7 || 0.3 || .3 || .0 || 1.3
|- align="center" bgcolor="#f0f0f0"
|  || 11 || 10 || 10.5 || .333 || . || 1.000^ || 1.5 || 0.0 || .1 || .1 || 1.1
|- align="center" bgcolor=""
|  || style="background:#FF8800;color:#423189;" | 16 || 0 || 14.8 || .430 || .325 || .742 || 1.8 || 2.3 || .3 || .1 || 7.6
|- align="center" bgcolor="#f0f0f0"
|  || style="background:#FF8800;color:#423189;" | 16 || 0 || 23.6 || .465 || .424 || .607 || 3.8 || 1.8 || style="background:#FF8800;color:#423189;" | 1.1 || .4 || 7.6
|- align="center" bgcolor=""
|  || style="background:#FF8800;color:#423189;" | 16 || 0 || 27.2 || .364 || .349 || style="background:#FF8800;color:#423189;" | .938^ || 5.6 || 0.9 || .8 || .6 || 8.2
|- align="center" bgcolor="#f0f0f0"
|  || style="background:#FF8800;color:#423189;" | 16 || style="background:#FF8800;color:#423189;" | 16 || 28.3 || .480 || .188 || .868 || 5.8 || 2.3 || .8 || .6 || 9.6
|- align="center" bgcolor=""
|  || 2 || 0 || 5.0 || .500 || . || .750 || 2.5 || .0 || .0 || .0 || 2.5
|- align="center" bgcolor="#f0f0f0"
|  || 6 || 6 || 17.3 || .543† || . || 1.000^ || 4.0 || .0 || .3 || .2 || 7.8
|- align="center" bgcolor=""
|  || style="background:#FF8800;color:#423189;" | 16 || style="background:#FF8800;color:#423189;" | 16 || 33.7 || .518 || .380 || .893 || 3.3 || style="background:#FF8800;color:#423189;" | 10.1 || .3 || .1 || 17.8
|- align="center" bgcolor="#f0f0f0"
|  || style="background:#FF8800;color:#423189;" | 16 || style="background:#FF8800;color:#423189;" | 16 || 33.3 || .502 || style="background:#FF8800;color:#423189;" | .475 || .759 || 5.4 || 1.1 || 1.1 || .3 || 19.8
|- align="center" bgcolor=""
|  || style="background:#FF8800;color:#423189;" | 16 || style="background:#FF8800;color:#423189;" | 16 || style="background:#FF8800;color:#423189;" | 36.5 || style="background:#FF8800;color:#423189;" | .519† || .000 || .754 || style="background:#FF8800;color:#423189;" | 6.6 || 1.1 || .7 || style="background:#FF8800;color:#423189;" | 1.5 || style="background:#FF8800;color:#423189;" | 22.2
|}

† – Minimum 20 field goals made.
^ – Minimum 10 free throws made.

Awards, records and milestones

Awards

Week/Month 
 Alvin Gentry (West Coach of the Month – November 2009)
 Alvin Gentry (West Coach of the Month – March 2010)
 Amar'e Stoudemire (West Player of the Month – March 2010)

All-Star 
 Nash and Stoudemire were selected to play in the 2010 NBA All-Star Game. Additionally, Nash was the 2010 Skills Challenge winner in the event held during All-Star Weekend.

Season 
 Nash and Stoudemire were named to the All-NBA Second Team.
 Nash led the league in two statistical categories: assists per game (11.0) and free throw percentage (93.8%).

Milestones 
 On January 16, 2010, Stoudemire scored his 10,000th career point in a loss to the Charlotte Bobcats.
 On January 26, 2010, Nash became the eighth player in NBA history to surpass 8,000 assists in the Suns' loss to the Utah Jazz.

Injuries and surgeries 
 Robin Lopez broke his ankle near the end of the season. This resulted in them wanting Jarron Collins and later, Dwayne Jones.

Transactions

Trades

Free agents

Additions 
On July 11, the Suns re-signed Grant Hill and Louis Amundson. On July 13, the Suns signed a two-year contract with former University of Arizona center Channing Frye.

Subtractions

Depth chart

References

External links 
 2009–10 Phoenix Suns season at ESPN
 2009–10 Phoenix Suns season at Basketball Reference

Phoenix Suns seasons
Phoenix